Sean R. Stubbs is a Canadian musician.  He has served as the drummer in the industrial rock bands Numb and Jakalope, and the punk rock band SNFU.  He has also been a member of alternative rock singer-songwriter Bif Naked's band.

Career
After playing in high school punk bands No Ambition and Inoxia at West Vancouver's Hillside Secondary School, Stubbs became involved with Numb around the time of its formation in 1986, when he served as the band's lead singer under the pseudonym Sean St. Hubbs. He was involved intermittently with the group, often serving as its live drummer, until its dissolution in 2000.

Stubbs played with Bif Naked beginning in 1996, and frequently acted as her live drummer as well.  Around this time, he also had a brief tenure with the Canadian punk band SNFU from 1998 to 1999.  Stubbs co-founded Jakalope in 2003.  Since then, he has also played with Air Raid Siren (featuring Rob Johnson, his former bandmate in SNFU) and Rat Silo (with members of Sons of Freedom).

In addition to playing music, Stubbs is a web development and graphic design instructor at the  Visual College of Art and Design.

References

External links
Sean Stubbs Official website
Sean Stubbs at Discogs
Rat Silo Official website

Canadian punk rock drummers
Canadian male drummers
Canadian industrial musicians
Musicians from Vancouver
Living people
Year of birth missing (living people)
SNFU members
Jakalope members